Ricardo González (born 24 October 1969) is an Argentine professional golfer.

Career
González turned professional in 1986, and has spent much of his career in Europe. He won a place on the European Tour in 1992 through qualifying school after playing on the second tier Challenge Tour in 1991. Having failed to win sufficient money to retain his tour card, he returned to the Challenge Tour in 1993.

Having moved to Africa, González returned to Europe in 1998 after winning the Challenge Tour sanctioned Tusker Kenya Open, and secured a second shot on the European Tour by finishing 5th on the Challenge Tour Rankings that season. He has successfully retained his playing privileges since then by consistently finishing inside the top 115 of the Order of Merit each year.

González has accumulated four European Tour wins, with a best year-end ranking on the European Tour Order of Merit of 25th place in 2001. He has also won many tournaments in South America, and has represented Argentina at the World Cup on four occasions, in 1996, 1998, 2005 and 2007.

He won his fourth career European Tour event in 2009 at the SAS Masters in Sweden by two strokes over Welshman Jamie Donaldson. It was his first win on the European Tour in five years.

After several down years, González qualified for the European Tour through qualifying school in 2016. At age 47, he was the oldest Q school graduate in Tour history.

Professional wins (28)

European Tour wins (4)

European Tour playoff record (0–1)

Challenge Tour wins (2)

Challenge Tour playoff record (2–0)

TPG Tour wins (9)

*Note: The 2020 Abierto Norpatagónico was shortened to 36 holes due to COVID-19 concerns.

Other wins (12)
1987 Rosario City Open (Arg)
1988 Praderas Grand Prix (Arg)
1995 Uruguay Open, La Plata Open (Arg)
1996 Chile Open
1997 Foz Iguazu Open (Brazil), Prince of Wales Open (Chile), Nigerian Open
1998 JPGA Championship (Arg)
2003 Abierto del Litoral (Arg)
2005 Abierto del Litoral (Arg)
2006 Parana Open (Arg)

European Senior Tour wins (1)

Results in major championships

Note: González never played in the Masters Tournament or the U.S. Open.

CUT = missed the half-way cut
"T" = tied

Results in World Golf Championships

"T" = Tied
Note that the HSBC Champions did not become a WGC event until 2009.

Team appearances
World Cup (representing Argentina): 1996, 1998, 2005, 2007

Equipment

Irons - Mizuno MP-62 Black Nickel, Project X 7.0
Wedges - Mizuno MPT-10 White Satin 52, 60/08

See also
2014 European Tour Qualifying School graduates
2016 European Tour Qualifying School graduates

References

External links

Argentine male golfers
European Tour golfers
Sportspeople from Corrientes Province
People from Corrientes
1969 births
Living people